Protein Wnt-7a is a protein that in humans is encoded by the WNT7A gene.

Function 

The WNT gene family consists of structurally related genes that encode secreted signaling proteins. These proteins have been implicated in oncogenesis and in several developmental processes, including regulation of cell fate and patterning during embryogenesis. This gene is a member of the WNT gene family. It encodes a protein showing 99% amino acid identity to the mouse Wnt7A protein. This gene not only guides the development of the anterior-posterior axis in the female reproductive tract but also plays a critical role in uterine smooth muscle pattering and maintenance of adult uterine function. It is also responsive to changes in the levels of sex steroid hormone in the female reproductive tract. Decreased expression of this gene in human uterine leiomyoma is found to be inversely associated with the expression of estrogen receptor alpha.

References

Further reading